Peter Eric Warr (18 June 1938, Kermanshah, Iran – 4 October 2010, Sainte-Foy-la-Grande, France) was a British businessman, racing driver and a manager for several Formula One teams, including Walter Wolf Racing, Fittipaldi Automotive, and Team Lotus.

Early life
Warr served a period of National Service as an officer in the Guards Division of the British Army, after training at the Royal Military Academy Sandhurst. Following demobilisation he moved into business. Warr joined Lotus Cars in 1958 as a salesman, soon switching to sister company Lotus Components where he handled sales of the company's customer racing cars, quickly rising to become Managing Director. During this period he also enjoyed a career as a racing driver, driving the same Lotus 18 Formula Junior cars that he sold during his day job. As a driver he did not reach Formula One, but he won a Formula Junior race in a Lotus 20 on the 4.8-mile south circuit at the Nurburgring on 28 April 1962, and is famous as the first winner of the Japanese Grand Prix in 1963, driving one of his employer's Lotus 23 sportscars.

Motorsport management
At the end of 1976 Warr moved to the new team set up by Canadian oil magnate Walter Wolf, and oversaw a very successful first year in which Jody Scheckter won three races and challenged for the World Championship. Wolf's fortunes flagged and at the end of 1979 was merged with the Copersucar Fittipaldi team. By mid 1981 Chapman had enticed Warr back to Lotus, where he would remain until 1989.

After Chapman's death, Warr took over the role of the team boss. He hired a young Ayrton Senna to partner Elio de Angelis against the wishes of John Player & Sons (JPS), the team's main sponsor, which wanted to keep Nigel Mansell. After the very wet 1984 Monaco Grand Prix, in which Mansell crashed out of the lead, Warr famously stated that "he'll never win a Grand Prix as long as I have a hole in my arse". Mansell went on to become one of the most successful British Formula One drivers of all time, with 31 race wins and becoming the only driver ever to hold F1 and CART titles at the same time.

As part of the deal to get the Honda engines, which at the time were the best in Formula One, Lotus agreed to sign Honda test driver Satoru Nakajima as Ayrton Senna's teammate. Also gone from the cars was the famous Black and Gold of sponsors JPS, replaced by the Yellow and Blue of Camel cigarettes.

After a poor start to the 1989 season, Warr was asked to stand down as Lotus boss and was replaced by Rupert Mainwaring and Peter Collins. The change in Lotus team management took place before the ninth round in Germany.

Warr died suddenly of a heart attack on 4 October 2010, in Sainte-Foy-la-Grande, France. The sport's commercial rights holder and former Brabham team principal, Bernie Ecclestone, paid tribute to Warr's importance to Formula One, saying that "he helped me to build it to what it is today".

Warr's book My view from the pit wall was unfinished when he died. Journalist Simon Taylor added a prologue and commentary and it was published by Haynes Publishing in 2012.

References

People from Kermanshah
1938 births
2010 deaths
English motorsport people
English racing drivers
Formula One team principals
Lotus Cars
Graduates of the Royal Military Academy Sandhurst